Margit Leskinen (19 February 1915 – 7 April 2002) was as Finnish swimmer. She competed in the women's 200 metre breaststroke at the 1948 Summer Olympics.

References

External links
 

1915 births
2002 deaths
Sportspeople from Vaasa
People from Vaasa Province (Grand Duchy of Finland)
Olympic swimmers of Finland
Swimmers at the 1948 Summer Olympics
Finnish female breaststroke swimmers